Argyrodendron actinophyllum is a large rainforest tree, native to eastern Australia. Common names include black booyong, blackjack, blush tulip oak, crowsfoot elm and Mackay tulip oak. The heartwood is coloured pink-brown. One of the most distinctive features of Argyrodendron actinophyllum is the large deep green leaves that radiate out from central stems - hence the name actino=ray, phyllum=leaf. Also the trunks form large characteristic buttresses.

References

Sterculioideae
Flora of New South Wales
Flora of Queensland
Malvales of Australia
Trees of Australia